Schlachtensee is a lake in the south west of Berlin, in the Steglitz-Zehlendorf borough (in the quarters of Schlachtensee), on the edge of the Grunewald forest. The lake lends its name to the surrounding area and to the nearby Studentendorf Schlachtensee, a student residence. The area has been part of Berlin since 1920.

Geography and Paul-Ernst Park
Schlachtensee is the most southerly in the Grunewald chain of lakes, which belongs geologically to the Teltow plateau, and was emerged some 15,000 years ago from the ice age as a glacial trough. The lake is popularly used for walking and for swimming, due to the good quality of the water.

The Paul-Ernst Park is located next to the S-Bahnhof Schlachtensee. The park is named for the writer, Paul Ernst (1866–1933), and contains a memorial stone. It is open to the public and runs down the slope to the lake and half a kilometer around the southern shore. At the end of the park is a large wooded area, while the area over the S-Bahn station is landscaped into lawns.

Since 2020 the lake is part of a new quarter of the same name.

References

Lakes of Berlin
Steglitz-Zehlendorf